Aparoopa is a 1982 Indian Assamese language drama film directed by Jahnu Barua. It is the first feature film of the director and also the first Assamese film produced by National Film Development Corporation of India.  It stars Biju Phukan, Suhasini Mulay, Sushil Goswami and Girish Karnad. The Hindi-language version is titled Apeksha.

Plot
In the colonial upper class society of Assam, a young woman has to give up pursuit of her university education for an arranged marriage with a rich tea-planter. The plantation and its social routine become a prison of boredom for her since her husband completely neglects her for his business. She is outraged when she discovers that her marriage takes place in order to eliminate her father's huge debt. She considers herself as having been sold to her husband. Then one day an old classmate and ex-lover, now an army officer, visits them. Depressed, she is drawn to him as she seeks fulfillment.

Casts and characters
Suhasini Mulay as Aparoopa
Biju Phukan as Rana
Sushma Seth as Rana's mother
Gopi Desai as Radha
Hiranya Deka as Ramu
Indra Bania as Anil 
Girish Karnad as Mr. Khanna

Award
Best Feature Film in Assamese (1982)

See also
Jollywood

References

External links
 

1982 films
Films set in Assam
Films scored by Bhupen Hazarika
Best Assamese Feature Film National Film Award winners
Films directed by Jahnu Barua
1980s Assamese-language films